Charlotte Gateway Station is a future intermodal transit station in Charlotte, North Carolina, United States. Currently operating as a streetcar stop for the CityLynx Gold Line, it is the centerpiece of the overall  Station District, and it will serve Charlotte Area Transit System (CATS) bus lines, the Lynx Silver Line light rail, Amtrak intercity trains and Greyhound Lines intercity buses. The district will also include parking facilities, mixed-use development and an elevated greenway. Estimated at a cost of $800.1 million (2017 US dollars) for full implementation of all public and private components, the project will be built in three phases, with Amtrak service tentatively scheduled to start in 2025.

History
In 1991, the City of Charlotte and the North Carolina Department of Transportation (NCDOT) completed a preliminary feasibility study for a new Uptown rail station to replace the existing Amtrak station, built in 1962 by the Southern Railway and located on North Tryon Street near the rail yard for SOU's successor, Norfolk Southern. The site chosen along West Trade Street, currently a Greyhound station since 1973, was once the location of three previous stations: the Atlanta & Charlotte Depot (prior to 1886), the Richmond and Danville Depot (1886-1905) and the Southern Depot (1905-1962).

In 1998, NCDOT began the acquisition of property for the station and supportive land uses (i.e. retail and offices). In 2002, NCDOT completed its feasibility study for the Charlotte Multi-Modal Station and Area Track Improvements. The study identified two possible options: The Preferred Alternative, which included the station, various track work and a greenway at $206.8 million (2002 dollars), and the Station Build Only Alternative at $109.6 million (2002 dollars).

Announced publicly in August 2005, the proposed Gateway Station is envisioned to serve as both a multimodal transit center in addition to both office and retail space. As originally presented, the station would feature an underground station for CATS buses, a  office building, and soaring lobby for other rail and bus services in the building's atrium.

In 2009, the American Recovery and Reinvestment Act of 2009 awarded $520 million grant for the Piedmont Improvement Project in North Carolina; which was used to make rail improvements identified in the 2002 feasibility study. In that same year, an Environmental impact assessment was completed that resulted in a Finding of No Significant Impact (FONSI) and the City of Charlotte and NCDOT signed a municipal agreement.

On November 1, 2012, NCDOT selected Houston-based developer, the Hines Group, for the project. In 2015, NCDOT won a $25 Million TIGER Grant, to help start construction of Gateway Station.

On August 30, 2021, the streetcar station was opened as part of the second phase of the CityLynx Gold Line.

The station's inter-city tracks and platform were completed in November 2022.  The first test run of a Piedmont train using the station occurred on November 29, 2022.

Station plans
It will be the southern terminus of Amtrak's Carolinian and Piedmont lines, as well as a service stop on Amtrak's Crescent and a major stop on the planned Southeast High Speed Rail Corridor. It will significantly improve connections between Amtrak and local transit; the current station is served by a single bus line. The station will also serve as a service stop for Greyhound routes running to Atlanta, Detroit, Jacksonville, New York City and Philadelphia. CATS also plans for the station to be a stop on the Lynx Silver Line.

Construction
Both the Charlotte Area Transit System (CATS) and NCDOT have started/completed various projects that impact the future station, including the CityLynx Gold Line and a new Locomotive and Railcar Maintenance Facility located on West Summit Avenue. However, groundbreaking for the Charlotte Gateway Station did not begin until July 2018. The project is using a phased implementation approach to facilitate the near-term development of the rail station while also setting the stage for private development to occur. There are three general phases with additional sub-phases.

Phase 1

At an estimate cost of $91.3 million (2017 dollars), the first phase has two parts:
 1A) Construct 2,000 feet of track, structures, and signals to support two new station tracks; construct retaining wall/earthwork; construct temporary intercity bus facility (completed August, 2019).
 1B) Construct rail platform and canopy for passenger loading/unloading.
Construction of Phase 1 was completed in November 2022.

Phase 2
At an estimate cost of $49.9 million (2017 dollars), the second phase has two parts:
2A) Construct platform canopy; construct station building (interim condition) with full construction of concourse level and core and shell only for plaza and mezzanine levels; construct temporary surface parking and passenger drop-off area.
2B) Decommission existing Amtrak station on North Tryon Street.
This phase is partially funded with capital carryover from phase 1.

Phase 3
At an estimate cost of $658.9 million (2017 dollars), the third phase has three parts:
3A) Construct greenway connection with bridge over Fourth Street, vertical circulation and retaining walls; construct bus facility, which includes structured parking and residential over retail wrapping garage (facility will serve as temporary parking for rail passengers till phase 3B is completed).
3B) Complete upper section of station building; extend greenway with bridge over Trade Street, vertical circulation and retaining walls; extend greenway to Bank of America Stadium; construct private development around station.
3C) Construct remote properties between Fifth and Seventh Streets; extend greenway to Ninth Street.
This phase is currently not funded, but is expected to be developed mostly by private developers.

Station layout
As of December 2, 2022, the station consists of one island platform in the center of Trade Street, for Gold Line service, and it is located on what will become the front entrance of the intermodal station.  A second, high-level island platform is located alongside Norfolk Southern's tracks for Amtrak service, which is not expected to begin before 2025.

References

External links

Gateway Station Home

Charlotte Area Transit System stations
Lynx Gold Line stations
Future Amtrak stations in the United States
Railway stations in the United States opened in 2021
2021 establishments in North Carolina